The Silence is a 2015 Indian Marathi drama film directed by Gajendra Ahire. The film stars Sairat director Nagraj Manjule, Raghubir Yadav, Mugdha Chaphekar and Anjali Patil.

Plot 
The Silence is based on a true story and revolves around a little girl Chini, who stays with her father in Konkan. Life is going great until one fateful day when her loved one turns into the one she despises for the rest of her life.

Cast 
 Raghubir Yadav as Baba
 Nagraj Manjule as Uncle
 Anjali Patil as Maami
 Mugdha Chaphekar as 21 years old Chini
 Kadambari Kadam as Manda
 Mihiresh Joshi as Shirya
 Vedashree Mahajan as 12 years old Chini
 Suresh Vishwakarma as Arjunbhai

Release

The Silence had its world premiere at the 12th Indian Film Festival Stuttgart on 18 July 2015. In Maharashtra, India the film got released on 6 October 2017.

Critical reception

Deborah Young of The Hollywood Reporter said that, "Director Gajendra Ahire creates a resonant drama around the terrible choices facing Indian women involved in sexual violence." Mihir Bhanage of The Times of India complimented the writer and director of the film saying that, "Ashwini Sidwani’s story is as real as it can get and Ahire’s treatment does justice to it. The presentation is so impactful that it is bound to make you think." The critic also praised the acting performances of Nagraj Manjule, Raghubir Yadav and Anjali Patil saying that, "Gajendra and Ashwini’s work is complemented brilliantly by the actors in the film." and gave the film a rating of 4 out of 5. Johnson Thomas of The Free Press Journal gave the film a rating of 3.5 out of 5 and said that, "The film is a powerful and heartfelt document of the kind of exploitation that women are subjected to and the trauma and aftermath they undergo in order to regain a healthy sense of self." Pradeep Menon of First Post gave the film a rating of 3.5 out of 5 and said that, "The Silence will affect you even though it doesn’t tell you anything you don’t know. You know women aren’t treated equally everywhere, but you don’t know what these women – and women in these situations out in the real world – have to go through." Business Standard appreciated the performances of Nagraj Manjule and Anjali Patil saying that, "Whatever the blemishes in this brave and often powerful film, the central idea is resoundingly well executed by the two central performances." and gave the film a rating of 4 out of 5. Ajay Kulye of Marathi Cineyug gave the film a rating of 3.5 out of 5 and said that, "If you want to watch meaningful and serious cinema about present day scenarios in our society, you should not miss The Silence."

Soundtrack

The soundtrack of The Silence consists of just 1 song, Dehavara Korlya Janm Khuna, which was composed by Indian Ocean, written by Gajendra Ahire and sung by Himanshu Joshi & Rahul Ram.

Awards 
The Silence has won honours at several national and international film festivals like the Best Child Actor award (for Vedashree) at the 16th New York Indian Film Festival, The German Star Of India (for Gajendra) at Indian Film Festival of Stuttgart 2015.

References

External links
 

2015 films
Films directed by Gajendra Ahire
2010s Marathi-language films